Emma Mary Francisco Tiglao (born December 8, 1994) is a Filipino actress, news anchor, model and beauty pageant titleholder who was crowned Binibining Pilipinas Intercontinental 2019. She represented the Philippines at the Miss Intercontinental 2019 pageant and finished as a Top 20 semifinalist. formerly host of CLTV36 and She is currently a news anchor for Mata ng Agila.

Early life and education 
Emma Mary Francisco Tiglao was born on December 8, 1994, in Mabalacat City, Pampanga, Philippines. She studied tourism at Holy Angel University. She mainly worked as model in Cambodia and Malaysia before becoming a news anchor for Eagle Broadcasting Corporation's Mata ng Agila.

Pageantry

Mutya ng Pilipinas 2012 
Tiglao first competed in Mutya ng Pilipinas 2012. She secured the first runner-up spot.

Binibining Pilipinas 2014 
Tiglao signed to compete in Binibining Pilipinas 2014 to win a crown. She entered the Top 25, then ended up as a Top 15 finalist to Mary Jean Lastimosa.

Miss World Philippines 2015 
In 2015, Tiglao joined the Miss World Philippines 2015 pageant and ended as the 4th Princess.

Binibining Pilipinas 2019 
Tiglao made her comeback to pageantry as she competed in Binibining Pilipinas 2019 on June 9, 2019, at the Smart Araneta Coliseum. She won two special awards during the ceremony; Best in National Costume and Miss Pizza Hut. She won Binibining Pilipinas Intercontinental 2019 and was crowned by the outgoing Binibining Pilipinas Intercontinental 2018, Karen Gallman, who is also Miss Intercontinental 2018 from the Philippines.

Miss Intercontinental 2019 
Tiglao represented the Philippines at the Miss Intercontinental 2019 pageant on December 20, 2019, in Egypt and finished as a Top 20 semifinalist. She also won the Miss Popularity and Miss May Care awards.

Good Bye To Pageantry 
In 2022 Tiglao confirmed that she is indeed saying goodbye to pageantry, amid speculation she will join the 2022 Miss Universe Philippines pageant.

Filmography

Television

Movies

TV commercials

See also

Athena Imperial
Cathy Untalan
Diane Querrer
Ganiel Krishnan
Tina Marasigan

References

External links 

People from Pampanga
1994 births
Living people
Binibining Pilipinas winners
Kapampangan people
Filipino female models
Mutya ng Pilipinas winners
Miss World Philippines winners
Women television journalists
Filipino television news anchors